The 2021 Colorado wildfire season was a series of wildfires that burned throughout the U.S. state of Colorado. According to the National Interagency Fire Center, as of July 1, 2021, at least  of land have burned in at least 337 wildland fires across the state. Hundreds of homes were burned, and the cities of Louisville and Superior were evacuated, during the Boulder County fires in late December.

List of wildfires

See also 
 Colorado State Forest Service
 List of Colorado wildfires

References

2021 in Colorado
Wildfires in Colorado